Cactus Plant Flea Market is an American design and fashion brand, known for depictions of faces with four eyes. Established by designer Cynthia Lu in 2015, it has collaborated with Nike, Kid Cudi, and created toys for an adult-version of the McDonald's Happy Meal in 2022.

Collaborations
The brand has created limited edition merchandise for Kid Cudi for his Man on the Moon III: The Chosen album. 

In October 2022, the brand created versions of classic Happy Meal Gang toys for the McDonald's limited edition adult version of the Happy Meal. The characters were given four eyes, the "double vision" look is a common feature of the brand.

References

External links

Clothing brands of the United States
Clothing retailers of the United States
Underwear brands
Sneaker culture
American companies established in 2015
Clothing companies established in 2015
2015 establishments in Delaware
Companies based in Wilmington, Delaware
2010s fashion
2020s fashion